Reference Services Review is a quarterly peer-reviewed academic journal published by Emerald Group Publishing, who acquired it from Pierian Press in 1998. The journal covers case studies and conceptual papers in all aspects of reference and user services.

Abstracting & Indexing 
The journal is abstracted and indexed in Education Full Text, Information Science & Technology Abstracts, Library and Information Science Abstracts (LISA), and Scopus.

References

Library science journals
Emerald Group Publishing academic journals
Publications established in 1973